Sally Gaze (b 1969) is a British Anglican priest. Since 2019, she has served as Archdeacon for Rural Mission in the Diocese of St Edmundsbury and Ipswich

Gaze was educated at Sidney Sussex College, Cambridge, the University of Birmingham and The Queen's Foundation. She was ordained in the Church of England as a deacon in 1996 and as a priest in 1997. She served her title at Martley between 1996 and 2000. After another curacy at Crickhowell she was the incumbent at Newton Flotman from 2002 to 2017. She was then Dean for Rural Mission Consultancy in St Edmundsbury for two years before being appointed archdeacon.

References

1969 births
Living people
Anglican archdeacons
21st-century English Anglican priests
20th-century English Anglican priests
Alumni of Sidney Sussex College, Cambridge
Alumni of the Queen's Foundation
Rural society
Women Anglican clergy